Semitic people, Semitic peoples or Semites may refer to
the racial and ethnic concept of Semitic race, in common use between late 18th to early 20th century, now obsolete
the archaeological and ancient history concept of Ancient Semitic-speaking peoples, describing those groups who left records of having written in Semitic languages
The ethnolinguistic grouping of Semitic-speaking peoples